Marine Drive is a picturesque promenade in Kochi, India. It is built facing the backwaters, and is a popular hangout for the local populace. Despite its name, no vehicles are allowed on the walkway. Marine Drive is also an economically thriving part of the city of Kochi. With several shopping malls it is as an important centre of shopping activity in Kochi. Major fast food joints, including Marrybrown, DiMark, Coffee Bar are present along the walkway. The view of the setting and rising sun over the sea mouth, and the gentle breeze from the Vembanad Lake has made Marine Drive an important tourist destination in Kochi. Hundreds of people (both natives, and tourists) throng the walkway during the evenings. The walkway starts from the High Court Junction and continues until the Rajendra Maidan. There are also several boat jetties along the walkway.

The walkway has three bridges: the Rainbow bridge, the Chinese Fishing Net Bridge and the House Boat Bridge.

Name and history 
Until the 1980s, the Shanmugham Road was the literal marine drive with the Kochi Lake and the adjoining Arabian Sea to its west. In the 1980s, GCDA started the Kochi Marine Drive project (following from the Bombay Marine Drive) and thus the whole of the present Marine Drive (part of the Kochi Lake, west of the Shanmugham Road to the present Marine Walkway) was claimed from the Kochi Lake. The then plan of GCDA was to eventually construct a road on the western border of this land, which would thus become a literal marine drive. But due to the enforcement of the Coastal Protection Laws in India in the 1990s, construction of a road became impossible. That's what led the GCDA toward settling down with a marine walkway instead of an actual marine drive. In 1992, under the leadership of the GCDA Chairman V. Joseph Thomas IPS a beautification project of the walkway was established, leading to the construction of the iconic Rainbow Bridge. But the name Marine Drive, since the initiation of the project in the 1980s, identifies the whole region (which was claimed from the lake), and not just the walkway.

Places lining Marine Drive
The Marine Drive stretches from the Jankar Jetty in the north to the Ernakulam Boat Jetty in the south. The adjoining areas are the Public Ground, Skyline apartments, Federal Bank Building, the GCDA Shopping Complex, the Kerala Trade Centre (under construction), Abad Bay Pride Mall, Pioneer Towers, Hotel Taj Gateway, Alliance Residency, DD Samudra Darshan apartment, and the India Priyadarshini Children's Park - in that order from North to South. These buildings and grounds are in between the marine drive walkway and the Shanmugham Road.

The Public Ground at the Northern part of the Marine Drive is the preferred venue for major exhibitions, and more importantly political meetings that mark major landmarks in the Kerala political scene. It was here that the meeting to announce AK Antony's comeback to the Indian National Congress was held in 1982. The GCDA Shopping Complex is a major shopping arcade in Ernakulam city.
The latest attraction is kulukki sarbath outlet, which makes local mocktails

Important landmarks on Marine Drive are:
 The Marine Walkway, stretching from Subash Chandra Bose Park in the south, to KSINC Boat Jetty in the north.
 The Rainbow Bridge, over Market Canal near GCDA shopping complex.
 The House boat Bridge, part of the Marine Walkway near Goshree bridge end. 
 The China Net Bridge, over Mullassery canal near Children's park, a part of the Marine Walkway.
 GCDA Shopping Complex, along Marine Drive.
 The Asoka-Tharangini Apartments

Marine Drive Scheme Phase 2
Marine Drive Scheme Phase 2 is an extension of the Phase 1 proposed in the land to be reclaimed of about 400 hect. extending from GIDA land to Varappuzha, as a part of Vision-2030.

Gallery

See also
 Queen's Way

References

External links

Regions of Kochi
Buildings and structures in Kochi
Neighbourhoods in Kochi
Waterfronts
Tourist attractions in Kochi